"Rock This Town" is the second single by American rockabilly band Stray Cats, released January 30, 1981 by Arista Records in the UK, where it peaked at No. 9 on the Singles Chart. It was taken from the band's 1981 debut album, Stray Cats.

Its first US release, by EMI America, was on the June 1982 album Built for Speed. Released as a single on August 31, 1982, it debuted on the Billboard Hot 100 for the week of September 18, 1982, and peaked at No. 9.

"Rock This Town" was listed by the Rock and Roll Hall of Fame as one of the "500 Songs that Shaped Rock and Roll".

The song has been featured in a variety of media, including the video games Guitar Hero II, Elite Beat Agents, and the video game based on the 2006 Pixar film Cars (video game).

Charts

Weekly charts

Year-end charts

References

1981 singles
1982 singles
Stray Cats songs
Songs written by Brian Setzer
1981 songs
EMI America Records singles
Arista Records singles
Music videos directed by Julien Temple